National Weather Service Northern Indiana (IWX) is a National Weather Service forecast office located between the towns of Syracuse and North Webster in Kosciusko County, Indiana. It provides weather and emergency information to twenty-four counties in northern Indiana, eight counties in northwest Ohio, and five counties in the southwestern Lower Peninsula of Michigan.

Most counties served by this office are located within the Eastern Time Zone (ET); the exceptions are La Porte, Pulaski, and Starke counties in Indiana, which are located within the Central Time Zone (CT).

History
Prior to the establishment of the Northern Indiana office, the National Weather Service and its predecessor, the U.S. Weather Bureau, operated separate offices in Fort Wayne and South Bend. The Fort Wayne office was established in 1911 and the South Bend office in 1939. In March 1998, the National Weather Service merged the Fort Wayne and South Bend offices together to create the National Weather Service in Northern Indiana. The new office moved into its present facilities between Syracuse and North Webster in August 1999 and assumed full responsibility for its county warning area in September 1999.

NOAA Weather Radio
The Northern Indiana office operates the following six NOAA Weather Radio transmitters to serve northern Indiana, northwest Ohio, southwestern Lower Michigan, and the southern portion of Lake Michigan.

The North Webster and Marion transmitters operate at 300 Watts; all other transmitters operate at 1000 Watts.

References

External links

National Weather Service Forecast Offices
Kosciusko County, Indiana